A by-election was held for the New South Wales Legislative Assembly electorate of East Sydney on 10 November 1859 because the Cowper government was defeated, causing Charles Cowper to resign his commission as Premier and Colonial Secretary and he resigned from parliament the following day. The second vacancy was caused because John Black had been appointed Secretary for Lands in the new Forster ministry,

Dates

Result

Charles Cowper resigned and John Black was appointed Secretary for Lands.

Aftermath
Charles Cowper was nominated in his absence and resigned after the election, resulting in the 1860 by-election, won by Peter Faucett.

See also
Electoral results for the district of East Sydney
List of New South Wales state by-elections

References

1859 elections in Australia
New South Wales state by-elections
1850s in New South Wales